A referendum on anti-corruption measures was held in Colombia on 26 August 2018. Voters were asked whether they approve of seven proposals aimed at reducing corruption: limiting the number of terms for politicians at all levels to three; requiring election candidates disclose their assets and those of their relatives; elected politicians being required to disclose their activities and private interests; a requirement for public hearings on budgets; a requirement for all public sector contracts to go out to tender; the removal of the right to parole for people convicted of corruption; and reducing 
the maximum salary of public officials and politicians from forty times the minimum wage to twenty-five times.

In order for the results to be legally binding, voter turnout was required to be at least one-third of registered voters (12.1 million). However, only 11.7 million voters (32%) cast ballots.

Background

The referendum was the result of a campaign called Consulta Popular Anticorrupción by senators Claudia López Hernández and Angélica Lozano Correa of the Green Alliance party. Under the constitution, a referendum can be called if 5% of registered voters sign a petition in favour. Between 24 January and 26 July 2017 a total of 4,236,682 signatures were collected, with 3,092,238 recognised as valid by the National Civil Registry, above the 5% threshold (1,762,083). The Senate approved the referendum on 5 June 2018 by a vote of 84–0, with President Juan Manuel Santos signing decree 1028/2018 on 18 June for the holding of the referendum.

Campaign
Many politicians supported "Yes" in the referendum, and a parody music video in the style of reggaeton was widely shared on the country's social media before the vote, using clips of these politicians. The President, Iván Duque, supported the referendum, though his mentor Alvaro Uribe did not, saying he would prefer to discuss anti-corruption measures in Congress. At the time of the referendum, Uribe was one of several Colombian politicians under investigation for alleged corruption. Additionally, six of the seven proposals had previously been introduced in Congress, and had all been voted down. On August 9, 2018, Duque introduced several packets to Congress, including three which covered areas of the vote. The Democratic Centre party, of which the President is a representative, did not actively campaign for votes before the referendum.

Results
Of the 11.7 million votes cast, 99% supported the amendments. However, the referendum came 470,000 votes short of the required 12.1 million votes, resulting in the vote being disqualified due to not reaching quorum.

References

2018 in Colombia
2018 referendums
August 2018 events in South America
2018